H. Thompson may refer to:

 H. Thompson (rugby league), rugby league footballer
 H. Thompson (Sheffield cricketer), English cricketer
 H. S. Thompson (1824–?), American songwriter

See also
 Thompson (surname)